Halloween 81 is a live box set by Frank Zappa released posthumously on October 2, 2020.  It is a compilation of live material in six CDs. Recorded between October 29 and November 1, 1981, it is the third album released in the Halloween box set series of live concerts that Frank Zappa performed yearly for Halloween. The live concert was the first live simulcast in cable history. It was also broadcast over the then-recently launched channel MTV. Material from these shows was used in later projects, such as The Dub Room Special and The Torture Never Stops.

Track listing

Halloween 81 Highlights track listing 

 "Chunga's Revenge" – 5:30
 "The Finest Night of the Year" – 2:50
 "I'm the Slime" – 2:37
 "Montana" – 3:48
 "Easy Meat" – 7:40
 "Joe's Garage" – 2:30
 "Why Does It Hurt When I Pee?" – 2:27
 "Sinister Footwear II" – 6:55
 "Stevie's Spanking" – 6:30
 "Goblin Girl" – 2:25
 "The Black Page #2" – 9:00
 "Strictly Genteel" – 6:33
 "Whipping Post" – 6:59
 "The Torture Never Stops" – 10:59

Personnel 

 Frank Zappa – lead guitar, vocals, baton
 Ray White – rhythm guitar, vocals
 Steve Vai – stunt guitar, vocals
 Tommy Mars – keyboards, vocals
 Robert Martin – keyboards, saxophone, vocals
 Ed Mann – percussion, vocals
 Scott Thunes – bass guitar, vocals
 Chad Wackerman – drums

References 

Frank Zappa compilation albums
2020 compilation albums